Santiago Javier Ostolaza Sosa (born 10 July 1962 in Dolores, Soriano) is a Uruguayan former football midfielder and the current manager of the Uruguayan U-17 national team. Among others clubs, he was manager for Nacional of Uruguay. He played for the same team when he was a player, and in 1988 he received the prize as man of the match after the Intercontinental Cup final against PSV Eindhoven, in which he scored two goals.

Ostolaza made 43 appearances for the Uruguay national football team from 1985 to 1993 and played at the 1990 FIFA World Cup.

He has a son, also named Santiago Ostolaza, who currently plays for Montevideo Wanderers.

References

External links

1962 births
Living people
People from Dolores, Uruguay
Uruguayan people of Basque descent
Uruguayan footballers
Uruguay international footballers
1990 FIFA World Cup players
1989 Copa América players
1993 Copa América players
C.A. Bella Vista players
Club Nacional de Football players
Defensor Sporting players
Montevideo Wanderers F.C. players
Cruz Azul footballers
Querétaro F.C. footballers
Club de Gimnasia y Esgrima La Plata footballers
Uruguayan Primera División players
Argentine Primera División players
Liga MX players
Expatriate footballers in Argentina
Expatriate footballers in Guatemala
Expatriate footballers in Mexico
Expatriate footballers in Paraguay
Expatriate footballers in Japan
Uruguayan expatriate footballers
Club Olimpia footballers
Uruguayan football managers
River Plate Montevideo managers
Montevideo Wanderers managers
Club Nacional de Football managers
Aurora F.C. players
Kyoto Sanga FC players
Association football midfielders
Pan American Games gold medalists for Uruguay
Medalists at the 1983 Pan American Games
Footballers at the 1983 Pan American Games
Pan American Games medalists in football
Deportivo Maldonado managers
Cerro Largo F.C. managers
Juventud de Las Piedras managers